Vishva Wijeratne (born 29 June 1992) is a Sri Lankan cricketer. He made his first-class debut for Sinhalese Sports Club in the 2012–13 Premier Trophy on 15 March 2013.

References

External links
 

1992 births
Living people
Sri Lankan cricketers
Ampara District cricketers
Sinhalese Sports Club cricketers
People from Chilaw